Kauila refers to two species of  trees in the buckthorn family, Rhamnaceae, that are endemic to Hawaii: Alphitonia ponderosa and Colubrina oppositifolia.  Their wood was prized for being extremely hard, and is so dense that it sinks in water.  Both occur in dry to mesic forest and are now rare; C. oppositifolia is listed as Endangered.
Also see Metrosideros polymorpha

References 
Wagner, W. L., D. R. Herbst, and S. H. Sohmer. 1990. Manual of the Flowering Plants of Hawaii.  University of Hawaii Press, Honolulu

Rhamnaceae
Trees of Hawaii
Plant common names
Hawaiian words and phrases
Endemic flora of Hawaii